Confessions of a Queen is a 1925 American silent  drama film directed by Victor Sjöström based upon a novel by Alphonse Daudet, Les Rois en Exil. Only an incomplete print of the film survives.

The film's sets were designed by the art director James Basevi.

Plot
The King of Illyris (Lewis Stone) marries a neighboring princess (Alice Terry), who finds out he has a mistress, Sephora (Helena D'Algy). Revolted, she turns to Prince Alexei (John Bowers) for friendship. Turmoil increases as a revolution demands the abdication of the King and the Queen opposes this decision.

Cast

References

External links

Lobby poster; Confessions of a Queen
 Period advertisement for the film
Still at silentfilmstillarchive.com

1925 films
Metro-Goldwyn-Mayer films
American silent feature films
1925 drama films
American black-and-white films
Films based on works by Alphonse Daudet
Silent American drama films
Films based on French novels
1920s American films
1920s English-language films